Anthony Grey Carr (18 May 1901 – 1968) was an English footballer who played in the Football League for New Brighton, Newport County, Preston North End and South Shields.

References

1901 births
1968 deaths
English footballers
Association football goalkeepers
English Football League players
Sunderland A.F.C. players
Newport County A.F.C. players
Sheffield Wednesday F.C. players
Preston North End F.C. players
Craghead United F.C. players
Gateshead A.F.C. players
Blyth Spartans A.F.C. players
Nelson F.C. players